Chakra Theertha is a 1967 Indian Kannada-language film, directed by Peketi Sivaram. The film stars Rajkumar, Udaykumar, Jayanthi and Balakrishna, with musical score by T. G. Lingappa. It is based on the novel of same name by T. R. Subba Rao. The director remade the film in Telugu in 1968 as Chuttarikaalu.

Cast

Rajkumar as Damodara
Udaykumar as Kashipathaiah
Jayanthi as Kamala, Kashipathaiah's daughter
Balakrishna
B. M. Venkatesh
Ganapathi Bhat
Dr. Sheshagiri Rao
Rajanand
Ramaraje Urs
Master Prabhakar
Jayashree
Shanthaladevi
Baby Raji
Madhavi

Soundtrack
The music was composed by T. G. Lingappa. The song Ninna Roopa Kannali was retained in the Telugu version as Neeve Naa Kanulalo.

References

External links
 

1967 films
1960s Kannada-language films
Films scored by T. G. Lingappa
Films based on Indian novels
Kannada films remade in other languages
Films directed by Peketi Sivaram